Staunton Country Park is a listed Regency landscaped parkland and forest encompassing approximately  in Hampshire, England.

An ornamental farm, ornamental lake, follies, maze, walled garden and glasshouses can be found within it. Entry to the parkland itself is free, however there is an associated visitor centre, with animals and attractions, which is not free.

It is situated between Leigh Park and Rowlands Castle, near Havant.

History

The first gardens on the site were begun by William Garrett who purchased the land in 1802. In 1817 the park was sold to John Julius Angerstein but in 1819 the sale was reversed after Angerstein brought a case against Garrett over non disclosure of dry rot. Garrett then put the estate back on the market. The park was purchased in 1820 by Regency politician and botanist Sir George Thomas Staunton as part of his country estate 'Leigh Park'. He made significant changes and additions to the gardens with the construction of the lake and a number of follies. On his death in 1859 the estate and gardens were inherited by Staunton's cousin Henry Cormick Lynch. Henry Lynch died just six weeks after receiving his inheritance and it was in turn passed to his eldest son George Staunton Lynch who then changed his name to George Staunton Lynch-Staunton. In 1861 he in turn sold the gardens and the estate to William Henry Stone for £60,000. Stone had a new house built which was finished in 1865 and most of the old house was demolished around the same time.

Stone sold the estate and gardens to Frederick Fitzwygram in 1875. When Frederick Fitzwygram died in 1904 the park and estate passed to his son Frederick Loftus Fitzwygram. He died in 1920 with the park this time passing to his sister Angela Fitzwygram. The estate and gardens were purchased by the city of Portsmouth in June 1944 and the gardens were transferred to the parks committee in 1950. They were established as a Country park in 1987.

Stone's house was demolished in 1959, however the Gothic Library, part of Garrett's house on the site, still remains.

Staunton Country Park has hosted Havant parkrun since 16 June 2012. In 2017 the park received lottery funding to carry out conservation work on its follies and construct a visitor center within the park's old Coach House.

Leigh Water

The park contains a lake called Leigh water. Prior to its construction the site was home to a pond a few yards in diameter. Its initial construction of the lake took place between 1828 and 1836. A three arched bridge known as the Chinese Bridge was built in 1830 and in 1832 two buildings were added; a boathouse apparently built to a Chinese design and a pergola. In either 1832 or 1834 an ornamental kiosk was added to the lakeside. It featured an onion dome surrounded by small minarets. In 1835 a Chinese-themed summer house was built by the site of the lake.

The lake is home to a number of islands, on the largest of which was a cottage while a smaller island named Fort Island was originally home to a small battery set up for nine guns. The flag of the Qing dynasty was flown on Fort Island. The cottage was used to house the under-gardener whose job it was to look after the lake area. A third island was Swan Island which as its name suggests was used for swans. Under Henry Stone the lake was expanded and an extra island added. He also had the cottage demolished and replaced by an American garden. Most of the surrounding buildings were removed at this point with some being replaced by new structures. The Chinese bridge remained but alterations were made to its appearance.

Follies
The park originally contained a number of follies, some of which still survive.

The Temple

The temple was a memorial commissioned by George Staunton in 1824 with a large memorial urn at its centre. As initially completed the temple contained dedications to Staunton's parents and further dedications to more distant relations and friends. In the following years an eight busts were added in a semi circle around the urn. Most of the busts were of friends of Staunton who had died after 1820 but one was of the then still living William Howley. In 1840 Staunton decided to add no further memorials to the temple. Further busts were added after this time but they were primarily of people still living. The temple was removed when William Henry Stone had his new home constructed on its site.

The Shell House

The Shell house was built in 1828 and is covered in shells from Hayling Island.
 The house is hexagonal in shape and was based on the design of the Chichester Cross. By 1836 George Staunton was using the shell house as a museum of curiosities for such items as a stuffed crocodile and examples of Roman pottery. This structure has permanent barricades erected in the arches to prevent entry. It is a Grade II* listed building

The Election Column

The Election Column was erected in 1837 and initially featured the date of Staunton's then sole election victory and two defeats. A year later the date of his election as an MP for Portsmouth was added. The column was removed at some point during Stone's ownership of the park with the inscription recording Staunton's election victories being moved to the shell house.

The Beacon

The beacon is a folly built in 1830 in the style of an Tuscan order temple, to a design by Lewis Vulliamy. It was largely built with material from the demolished Purbrook house. It features a hole in a roof designed to allow a flagpole to be placed there. The roof is domed, with a plain frieze and architrave and supported by eight Tuscan columns.
Starting in 2017 as part of a £3.5m Heritage Lottery grant for Staunton Country Park, the beacon was restored.

The Moss House
The moss house appears to have been built at some point in the first half of the 1830s and featured covered seat. The inside was lined with moss and the floor was made up of Emsworth pebbles of differing colours. It was removed in the 1860s as part of the building work undertaken by William Henry Stone.

The Canning obelisk

The obelisk was another Lewis Vulliamy design. Construction started in August 1832 with the obelisk featuring a dedication to George Canning. By 1986 it was in a very poor condition.

References

External links
 Hampshire County Council Staunton Country Park
 Maps: 

Country parks in Hampshire